is a puzzle mobile game featuring the police mouse, Mappy. It was released and published by Namco on February 14, 2003 in Japan.

References

Mobile games
Puzzle video games
2003 video games
Namco games
Mappy
Video games about mice and rats
Video games about police officers
Video games developed in Japan